It's That Girl Again is the fourth solo studio album by Polish singer Basia, released on 11 March 2009 by Koch Records. It is her first studio album in fifteen years since 1994's The Sweetest Illusion.

Overview
It's That Girl Again was Basia's first solo studio album in 15 years, following 1994's The Sweetest Illusion. In the meantime, she recorded a reunion album with Matt Bianco, 2004's Matt's Mood, released a solo live album, a compilation, and made guest appearances on other artists' albums. The semi-hiatus was caused by depression after the passing of Basia's mother and other close people.

Work on the album commenced at the end of 2006, shortly after Basia finished touring with Matt Bianco, and the material was completed before the end of 2007. The title song was one of the first tracks composed for the project, and was inspired by a friend of Basia, who had died several years prior to the release of the album. The album also features "Amelki śmiech" (English: "Amelka's Laughter"), Basia's first song performed entirely in Polish.

Since her contract with Sony had already expired, the singer had certain difficulties finding a new label, but the album was eventually released through Koch Records (later renamed to Entertainment One Music) in most territories, and distributed by Magic Records in Poland. The ballad "A Gift" was launched as the first radio single in Poland in February 2009, followed by "Blame It on the Summer" on the US radio in March and subsequently in digital music stores. "A Gift" targeted AC/pop radio stations while "Blame It on the Summer" was serviced to more jazz-oriented networks. "I Must" was a radio single in Poland in September 2009 and "If Not Now Then When" followed in May 2010 as a radio single in the USA. The singer has revealed that there were plans to film music videos for "A Gift" and "I Must", however, if ever filmed, the clips have never been officially released.

Track listing

Personnel 
 Basia Trzetrzelewska – vocals
 Danny White – keyboards 
 Peter White – guitars 
 Andy Ross – guitars (6, 7, 9)
 Julian Crampton – bass (2)
 Marc Parnell – drums 
 Paul Booth – saxophones (1, 6)
 Ian Kirkham – saxophones (5)
 Fayyaz Virji – trombone (1)
 Kevin Robinson – trumpet, flugelhorn, French horn, backing vocals 
 Mark Reilly – backing vocals (2)
 The Polish Chorus – choir (12)

Production 
 Basia Trzetrzelewska – producer
 Danny White – producer 
 David Bascombe – mixing 
 Richard Bull – mastering 
 Grainne White – design 
 Paul Cox – portrait photography 
 Carl Leighton-Pope – management

Charts

Certifications

Release history

References

External links
 The official Basia website
 It's That Girl Again on Discogs

2009 albums
Basia albums
E1 Music albums